Dream Concert may refer to:
 Dream Concert (South Korea), an annual K-pop joint concert held in South Korea
 The 14 Hour Technicolor Dream, a 1967 fundraising concert held in London, U.K.
 The Dream Concert: Live from the Great Pyramids of Egypt, a 2016 live concert album and video by Yanni
 Wonder Dream Concert, a 1975 concert held in Jamaica